"Still in Saigon", is a song written by Dan Daley and performed by the Charlie Daniels Band and released on their 1982 album Windows. It was written by Daley in May 1981.

Background
The song is a portrayal of the plight of the American Vietnam veteran a decade after the war; it was part of an early 1980s wave of attention to the subject, presaging treatments such as Bruce Springsteen's "Born in the U.S.A." and "Shut Out the Light", Billy Joel's "Goodnight Saigon", Huey Lewis and the News' "Walking on a Thin Line", Paul Hardcastle's "19" and somewhat later Steve Earle's "Copperhead Road".

Content
The story is told ten years after the protagonist faced being drafted into the Vietnam War.  Though he could have avoided being sent (either by escaping to Canada as a war protester, or choosing to stay in school under a student deferment), believing he was "brought up differently/I couldn't break the rules" elected to go ahead and serve.

He remained in Vietnam for "thirteen months and fifteen days", with the latter portion ("the last ones were the worst") taking an emotional toll on Daniels ("one minute I'd kneel down and pray/The next I'd stand and curse").  The emotional problems only worsened upon his return, as he came home to a bitterly divided family – his war-protesting younger brother labels him a "killer" while his father calls him a "vet".  Moreover, he began to exhibit signs of post-traumatic stress disorder (PTSD) resulting from his service (constantly looking behind doors for the enemy, and exhibiting flashbacks during the rainy summer season); symptoms which ten years later continue to plague him.

Chart performance

References

External links
 

Songs about soldiers
Songs about the military
Charlie Daniels songs
1982 singles
Songs of the Vietnam War
Epic Records singles
Song recordings produced by John Boylan (record producer)
Songs about Vietnam
1982 songs